Cummings may refer to:

Places

Canada 
 Cummings, Saskatchewan, an unincorporated hamlet

United States 
 Cummings, Mendocino County, California, an unincorporated community
 Cummings, Kansas
 Cummings, North Dakota, an unincorporated community
 Cummings Research Park, Huntsville, Alabama
 Cummings Township, Lycoming County, Pennsylvania
 Cummings Mountain (disambiguation)

Other uses
 Cummings (surname)
 USS Cummings, two United States Navy destroyers
 Cummings Jewish Centre for Seniors, in Montreal, Quebec, Canada
 Walt Cummings, a fictional character in the TV series 24
 Cummings, a character in The Diary of a Nobody by George and Weedon Grossmith

See also 
 Cummings House (disambiguation)
 Cumming (disambiguation)
 Cummins (disambiguation)